Yoan Garneau, also known as Yoan, (born May 10, 1995) is a Canadian pop, rock and country singer from Ferme-Neuve, Quebec. The winner of Season 2 of the reality television series La Voix in 2014, he released his self-titled debut album in 2015.

Garneau's father Sylvain is a country musician. Before his original audition for La Voix, Garneau had difficulty deciding whether to audition with an original song or a cover of Billy Joe Shaver's "Live Forever", deciding only at the last minute to go with the Shaver cover.

His debut album Yoan, released on March 25, 2015, features duets with Isabelle Boulay, his coach on La Voix, and country singer Brett Kissel. The album features material in both English and French, mixing both original compositions and covers; its lead single is a cover of Jimmy Reed's "Baby What You Want Me to Do".

The album debuted at #1 on Billboards Canadian Albums Chart for the week of April 11, 2015, retaining that spot for the weeks of April 18 and April 25. In its first two months of release, the album sold approximately 90,000 copies.

Discography

Albums

Awards and nominations

References

Canadian rock singers
Canadian pop singers
Canadian country singer-songwriters
Canadian male singer-songwriters
French-language singers of Canada
The Voice (franchise) winners
Singers from Quebec
French Quebecers
People from Laurentides
Living people
Participants in Canadian reality television series
1995 births
Canadian Country Music Association Top Selling Canadian Album winners
21st-century Canadian male singers